Usana may refer to:
 Usana (planthopper), a genus of insects
 USANA Health Sciences, an American company

See also 
 USANA Amphitheatre, in Utah, US
 Uzana (disambiguation)